Aeroflot Flight N-63 was a flight which crashed killing 48 people in Ukraine in 1971.

It was a scheduled Antonov An-24 flight on 12 November 1971 from Kiev-Zhulhyany Airport in Ukraine to Vinnitsa Airport in Ukraine. The flight proceeded routinely through takeoff and cruise, but started to enter trouble when on final approach due to the bad weather; this included freezing rain with fog and low clouds. The first landing attempt was aborted. The pilots attempted a second approach, but could not land and initiated a go-around. During the go-around, the aircraft went nose-high and stalled before crashing  short of the threshold. All 48 passengers and crew on board were killed. The aircraft had been operating for 10,658 flight cycles and had a total of 11,329 flight hours.

References

 
Aviation accidents and incidents in the Soviet Union
Aviation accidents and incidents in 1971
Accidents and incidents involving the Antonov An-24
N-63
November 1971 events in Europe
Aviation accidents and incidents caused by loss of control
1971 in the Soviet Union